Events from the year 1802 in Ireland.

Events
First Christian Brothers' school founded by Edmund Rice in Waterford.
Cork Fever Hospital and House of Recovery founded by Dr. John Milner Barry in Cork.
Linen Hall Library moves into permanent premises in the White Linen Hall in Belfast.

Arts and literature
Henry Boyd completes the first full English translation of Dante's Divine Comedy.
 A collection of Irish language religious verse by Tadhg Gaelach Ó Súilleabháin (died 1795), Timothy O'Sullivan's Pious Miscellany, is published in Clonmel.

Births
18 April – Robert Patterson, businessman and naturalist (died 1872).
24 May – Robert Baldwin Sullivan, lawyer, judge, and politician in Canada, second Mayor of Toronto (died 1853).
12 December – Robert Templeton, naturalist, artist and entomologist (died 1892).
Juan Galindo, born John Galindo, fighter for Central American independence and explorer (killed in action 1839 in Honduras)

Deaths
28 January – Joseph Wall, army officer, colonial governor and murderer (born 1737)
2 February – Armar Lowry-Corry, 1st Earl Belmore, politician and High Sheriff (born 1740).
30 March – Aedanus Burke, soldier, judge, and United States Representative from South Carolina (born 1743).
20 July – Isaac Barré, soldier and politician (born 1726).
24 October – John Ramage, artist (born 1748).

References

 
Years of the 19th century in Ireland
1800s in Ireland
Ireland
 Ireland